Jesse Hartley (21 December 1780 – 24 August 1860) was Civil Engineer and Superintendent of the Concerns of the Dock Estate in Liverpool, England between 1824 and 1860.

Hartley's career
Despite having no experience of dock building, Hartley was the first full-time professional dock engineer in the world. He had previously worked for his father Bernard Hartley, a stonemason, architect and bridgemaster John Carr, and the Duke of Devonshire.

Initially he was appointed Deputy Dock Surveyor to John Foster Jr. However, due to John Foster Jr. resigning three days later, he was promoted to Acting Dock Surveyor. During his service, he not only built new docks, but also modernised all of the existing docks with the exception of the Old Dock (opened in 1715), which had become disused and filled in. The docks at Liverpool grew from  during his tenure.

In 1831 he was appointed to convert the Manchester Bolton & Bury Canal to a railway line. He persuaded the company to keep the canal open and build the railway more or less along its route.

Between 1841 and 1843 he prepared a number of different designs for fireproof construction of dockside warehouses. In 1843, he made models of warehouse arches at the Trentham Street Dockyard, to test sheet iron lined timber floored building method and brick and iron building materials. Through fire testing of these models, he eventually convinced the Dock Board Trustees of the benefits of his iron framed construction method. These experiments proved the worthiness of his fireproof design and he designed the Royal Albert Dock, Liverpool to these specifications.

Hartley's improvements over earlier dock and warehouse design included the use of locks to keep the water at a constant level, so that loading and unloading of ships’ cargoes was not reliant on the tide and the enclosure of the dock with high boundary walls, to reduce theft. He also adapted and improved the design of St Katherine's Dock in London, by incorporating high arches in the buildings to accommodate cranes.

In his younger days, Hartley is reputed [reference wanted] to have worked for William Alexander Madocks at Port Madock (now Porthmadog) in Caernarfonshire, Wales. Examination of the piers of the Britannia Bridge there, across the River/Afon Glaslyn, shows cyclopean masonry of the type used by Hartley in Liverpool. The bridge can be dated c.1810 (give or take a year), was probably built in the dry and the river diverted through it in 1811/1812. The parapets have been renewed; there is a main road and a tramway/railway running across the bridge. Evidence of the original tramway was found during renewal of the road surface about 2008. It is thought by some to be the oldest railway bridge in the world still in use, but it has not carried a tramway/railway for the whole of that time.

Docks built
Clarence Dock – opened 1830
Brunswick Dock – opened 1832
Waterloo Dock – opened 1834
Victoria Dock – opened 1836
Trafalgar Dock – opened 1836
Canning Half-tide Dock – opened 1844
Royal Albert Dock, Liverpool – opened 1845 (officially opened 1846 by the Prince Consort)
Salisbury Dock – opened 1848
Collingwood Dock – opened 1848
Stanley Dock – opened 1848
Nelson Dock – opened 1848
Bramley-Moore Dock – opened 1848
Wellington Dock – opened in 1851
Wellington Half-tide Dock
Sandon Dock – opened 1849
Huskisson Dock – opened 1852
Canada Dock – opened 1859

Notable buildings
Hartley utilised an eclectic mix of styles and methods of construction in the various buildings associated with the docks. These ranged from the cyclopean to ordinary brick built methods and styles as diverse as Greek revival and severe Gothic.

Albert Dock Warehouses
Wapping Dock warehouse
Stanley Dock warehouses
Stanley and Wapping Docks’ accumulator towers
Canada Dock accumulator tower (demolished)
Wapping policeman's lodge
Salthouse Dock Transit shed (rebuilt granite gable end survives)
Canning Half-tide Dock watchmen's huts
Victoria Tower
Point Lynas Lighthouse
Turton and Entwistle Reservoir

Personal life 
Hartley had one son, J.B. Hartley (1814–1869).

References

Jesse Hartley – Dock Engineer to the Port of Liverpool 1824–60 – Nancy Ritchie-Noakes, 1980
Buildings of Liverpool – Liverpool Heritage Bureau, 1978
Pevsner Architectural Guides – Liverpool – Joseph Sharples, 2004
Lancashire: Liverpool and the Southwest - Richard Pollard, Nikolaus Pevsner - 2006 - Yale University Press

External links
 Liverpool Museums – Jesse Hartley

1780 births
1860 deaths
Engineers from Liverpool
English surveyors
Harbour engineers